General elections were held in Bangladesh on 7 May 1986. A total of 1,527 candidates contested the election. The result was a victory for the Jatiya Party, which won 153 of the 300 seats. Voter turnout was 61.1%. Bangladesh Nationalist Party, the winner of the previous elections, boycotted the election.

British observers including a journalist termed the elections a "tragedy for democracy" and a "cynically frustrated exercise".

Background 
In 1982 a coup d'état led by Army Chief Hussain Muhammad Ershad overthrew democratically elected President Abdus Sattar, suspended the Constitution and imposed martial law. Parliament was dissolved and all political parties were banned. Ershad appointed Justice A. F. M. Ahsanuddin Chowdhury as President on 27 March 1982, a position which he held until December 1983 when Ershad assumed the presidency himself. In 1983 Ershad promised to hold presidential elections in May 1984 and to restore parliamentary government the following year. However, neither elections were held until 1986.

Amid increasing opposition from the general public, Ershad aimed to legitimise his regime by holding a referendum in March 1985. The official result of the referendum was overwhelmingly in support of his regime; however, there were allegations of large-scale vote rigging.

Ershad planned to hold a presidential election in early 1986, but was faced with vigorous opposition from the Bangladesh Awami League-led eight-party alliance, Bangladesh Nationalist Party-backed seven-party alliance and the left-leaning five-party alliance, who demanded the lifting of martial law and the holding of parliamentary elections prior to a presidential election. Conceding to opposition demands general elections were scheduled for 7 May 1986.

On 1 January 1986 Ershad formed Jatiya Party to represent his interests in the elections. The winners of the previous elections, BNP, boycotted the elections but Awami League, and the majority of other political parties, contested. At the time of elections, martial law was still in place and Ershad was still Army Chief.

Results
The result was a victory for Ershad's Jatiya Party, which won a simple parliamentary majority with 153 of 300 seats. However the result was controversial, with Awami League accusing the Jatiya Party of election rigging and a British team of observers - consisting of a former Labour Party minister, a Conservative Party lawmaker and a BBC journalist - terming the elections a "tragedy for democracy" and a "cynically frustrated exercise".

Aftermath
In August 1986 Ershad resigned from military service and a presidential election was held in October 1986, in which Ershad was declared the victor. However the elections were controversial as they were boycotted by all major opposition candidates and there were reports of irregularities.

In November 1986, the second session of the third parliament was used for passing the constitution's seventh amendment bill, which primarily protected Ershad and his regime from prosecution for actions taken under his years of military rule, and on 11 November martial law was lifted.

In July 1987, the opposition parties united in opposition of government policies. Ershad declared a state of emergency in November, dissolved parliament in December, and scheduled new parliamentary elections for March 1988.

References

General
General elections in Bangladesh
Bangladesh
Bangladesh